The third season of Reba, an American television sitcom series, aired on The WB from September 12, 2003 to May 14, 2004. The season consisted of 23 episodes. 

The show was broadcast during 2003–04 television season on Fridays at 9 pm. The season averaged 4.0 million viewers, which is slightly lower than the previous season. The entire season was released on DVD in North America on April 25, 2006.

Main Cast
 Reba McEntire as Reba Hart
 Christopher Rich as Brock Hart
 Melissa Peterman as Barbara Jean Hart
 JoAnna Garcia as Cheyenne Montgomery
 Steve Howey as Van Montgomery
 Scarlett Pomers as Kyra Hart
 Mitch Holleman as Jake Hart

Episodes

Home media

References

2003 American television seasons
2004 American television seasons
Reba (TV series) seasons